The CBC Literary Prize is a Canadian literary award, granted annually in three categories: short stories, poetry, and creative non-fiction. The Award is directed towards Anglophone writers.

About the prize 
The CBC Literary Prize is granted annually in three categories: short stories, poetry, and creative non-fiction. For each category, the winner receives $6,000 and a two-week writing residency at the Banff Center for Arts and Creativity. Four runners-up receive $1,000 each, and all the winning works are published on the CBC Books website. 

The Prize was established as a partnership between the Canadian Broadcasting Corporation, the Canada Council for the Arts and enRoute, Air Canada’s inflight magazine. The Canada Council for the Arts has stated that, "these awards have brought to the public's attention many talented young people who have since gone on to become established writers."

Notable previous winners include writers Michael Ondaatje, W.D. Valgardson, and Gwendolyn MacEwen, as well as poets Don Domanski, Mary di Michele, and diplomat Charles Ritchie. Author Carol Shields wrote in a letter to CBC's chairperson that winning the CBC Literary Prize was fundamental to her career as a writer.

Winners 
The list of winners of the CBC Literary Prize include:

References

External links 
 CBC Literary Prize 

Canadian literary awards
Awards established in 1979